Clotilde (c. 474–545) was a saint and the wife of the Frankish leader Clovis I.

Clotild, Clotilda, Clotilde, Chlotilde, or Chrotilde may also refer to:

People
 Clotilde (died 531), daughter of Clovis, wife of King Amalaric
 Clotilde (floruit 673), founder of a monastery at Bruyères-le-Châtel
 Clotilde (died 692), wife of King Theuderic III
 Clotilde de Surville (15th century), French writer and poet
 Clotilde of France (1759–1802), sister of King Louis XVI of France and wife of King Charles Emmanuel IV of Sardinia
 Princess Clotilde of Saxe-Coburg and Gotha, (1846–1927), Austrian archduchess
 Clotilde Arias (1901–1959), Peruvian composer
 Clotilde Dissard (1873-1919), French journalist, feminist
 Clotilde González de Fernández (1880-1935), Argentine educator, writer
 Clotilde Tambroni (1758–1817), Italian philologist and linguist
 Clotilde Théry, French molecular biologist

Other uses
 Clothilde (musician), French singer active in the late 1960s
 Clotilde (opera), an 1815 opera by Carlo Coccia, libretto by Gaetano Rossi
 Clotilda (slave ship), the last ship to carry slaves from Africa to the United States
 La Clotilde, Chaco, Argentina
 Tropical Storm Clotilda, a 1987 tropical cyclone in Réunion

See also
 Sainte-Clotilde (disambiguation)
 Chrothildis (7th century), Frankish queen consort to king Theuderic III